Wahlenbergia planiflora, commonly known as flat bluebell, is a small herbaceous plant in the family Campanulaceae native to eastern Australia.

It blooms throughout the year producing blue-yellow-white flowers.

The species is found in New South Wales, Victoria and Queensland.

There are two known subspecies:
 Wahlenbergia planiflora subsp. longipila
 Wahlenbergia planiflora subsp. planiflora

References

planiflora
Flora of New South Wales
Flora of Victoria (Australia)
Flora of Queensland
Plants described in 1992